Canoe Island can refer to:
Canoe Island (Nova Scotia)
Canoe Island (Ontario)
Canoe Island (Washington)